Camp Favorites is a studio album  by "The Campers" that was released in 1962 or 1963 by Cameo Records. It is the first known commercial record made by folksinger, songwriter, and social activist Phil Ochs.

"The Campers" consist of Ochs (who is not credited on the record), an unknown female vocalist, and a group of young singers, accompanied by Dick Weissman on banjo.

The tracks on Camp Favorites are traditional songs that children might sing at summer camp, and the record sleeve is illustrated with a group of youngsters singing around a campfire.

Camp Favorites was unknown among Phil Ochs fans until 2000, when David Cohen prepared his comprehensive catalog of Ochs' works (Phil Ochs: A Bio-Bibliography). Michael Ochs, Ochs' brother and former manager, told Cohen that Phil had recorded a record of campfire songs, but that his name was not used on the album. Nobody in the Ochs family had ever seen a copy of the album. After considerable research, Cohen was able to identify Camp Favorites and locate a copy.

This album can be listened to online.

Track listing

Side one
 "The Welcome Song" (Traditional – 1:46)
 "We'll Build a Bungalow" (Traditional – 2:02)
 "Polly Wolly Doodle" (Traditional – 2:08)
 "Gee Mom" (Traditional – 2:13)
 "Patsy Ory Ory Aye" (Traditional – 2:11)
 "Cannibal King" (Traditional – 2:21)

Side two
 "Hambone" (Traditional – 3:11)
 "Friends Friends Friends" (Traditional – 1:49)
 "I've Got Sixpence" (Traditional – 2:00)
 "A Thousand Years Ago" (Traditional – 2:10)
 "Adam and Eve" (Traditional – 2:05)
 "Hand Me Down My Walkin' Cane" (Traditional – 2:01)

Participants
 Phil Ochs — vocals
 Other unknown vocalists
 Dick Weissman — banjo

References

Further reading
 [https://web.archive.org/web/20070622113436/http://pobox.upenn.edu/~lapis/camp.html Another Side of Phil Ochs] by David Cohen
 The Campers -- Camp Favorites

External links
 Camp Favorites on YouTube

Phil Ochs albums
Cameo Records albums
1962 debut albums
Children's music albums
Works published under a pseudonym
Camping